Zeka Goore (born 15 March 1984 in Abidjan) is an Ivorian footballer who currently plays for Egyptian club Eastern Company.

References

1984 births
Living people
Ivorian footballers
Association football forwards
Ivorian expatriate sportspeople in Egypt
Ivorian expatriate footballers
Footballers from Abidjan
Eastern Company SC players
Al-Wasl F.C. players
Expatriate footballers in Egypt
Expatriate footballers in the United Arab Emirates
UAE Pro League players